Team Britain, or Team UK, was a professional wrestling stable brought together to compete in Total Nonstop Action Wrestling's 2004 America's X-Cup Tournament and TNA World Cup 2013. Also, a Team Britain was formed in 2006, but it never was used.

History

2004
Team Britain didn't have a major role in TNA 2004 America's X-Cup as the Cup was mostly highlighted by Team Canada, Team Mexico (or Team AAA), and Team USA (or Team NWA). Team Britain would face off against Team Mexico on April 7, 2004 in a losing effort. They did not partake in the World X-Cup event in May.

2006
Team Britain was slated to return to TNA for the 2006 World X-Cup Tournament. When Team Canada's coach Scott D'Amore mentioned his Team's (so far) lack of involvement in the World X Cup he referred to a "Team UK" (first thought to be a possible misnaming of Team Britain) while listing a host of other possible entries. The return of the team and its participants were confirmed on the March 17, 2006 in a press release on the Frontier Wrestling Alliance (FWA):

Team Britain became the only team that did not return to the tournament, however, due to its members having conflicting schedules.

2013
At TNA One Night Only, World Cup, Team UK was formed again. The captain was Magnus and the other members, Douglas Williams, Rob Terry, Rockstar Spud and Hannah Blossom. However, Team UK tied with Team International for 3rd place.

Members
2004
James Mason (Captain)
Robbie Dynamite
Xtreme Dean Allmark
Frankie Sloan
David Taylor (Coach / Mentor)

2006 
Nigel McGuinness (Captain)
Doug Williams
Jonny Storm
Jody Fleisch
Note: The 2006 team was reported and confirmed, but ultimately did not partake in the TNA 2006 World X-Cup Tournament

2013
Magnus (Captain)
Douglas Williams
Rob Terry
Rockstar Spud
Hannah Blossom

Competitive record

World X Cup record

See also
 The British Invasion (professional wrestling)

References

External links
TNAWrestling.com (Official Website of TNA Wrestling)

Impact Wrestling teams and stables
British professional wrestlers